Coleophora arctostaphyli is a moth of the family Coleophoridae. It is found in Europe.

Description

The larvae feed on Arctostaphylos uva-ursi. The mouth angle is about 45°. Before making its first case, the young larvae live in a frass-filled contorted corridor. The larval stage lasts two seasons. In the first autumn, they live in a mine, where hibernation occurs. After hibernation, a case is made in which it feeds until spring, then aestivates, feeds in autumn and overwinters for the second time. During the second spring, a new case is made and the larva feeds until April or May when it is full-grown.

Distribution
It is found from Fennoscandia to the Iberian Peninsula and Italy and from Great Britain to Poland.

References

External links

arctostaphyli
Moths described in 1934
Moths of Europe